Adenotrias is one of 36 sections in the genus Hypericum. It contains 3 species and its type species is Hypericum russeggeri.

References

Adenotrias
Adenotrias